Sychari or Sichari ( [];  or ) is a village in the Kyrenia District of Cyprus. De facto, it is under the control of Northern Cyprus. Its population in 2011 was 290.

References 

Communities in Kyrenia District
Populated places in Girne District